Amar Asha is a Gujarati poem by Manilal Dwivedi. It was his last poetic work  published posthumously in the 1898 issue of his own magazine, Sudarshan. Described as Manilal's most important work and cited as one of the most popular poems in Gujarati literature, Amar Asha has been studied and interpreted by several writers since its publication.

Publication history

Amar Asha was first published in Sudarshan (vol. 14, issue 1) on the day Manilal died, 1 October 1898, with some typographical errors. It was reproduced and included in many anthologies of poems, such as the second edition of Atmanimajjan, a collection of poems by Manilal, which was published in 1914 by his younger brother, Madhavlal Dwivedi, and an Himmatlal Anajaria's anthology, Kavyamadhurya (1920), with some corrections suggested by Amrit Keshav Nayak. It was also published in the 3rd edition of Atmanimajjan (1959), edited by Dhirubhai Thaker, based on the original manuscript.

Composition

Amar Asha consists of 10 couplets and has been composed in Persian beher (meter) Hazaj. The opening couplet has rhymes in both lines, while the subsequent couplets' second line rhymes with the first couplet; i.e., the rhyme scheme is AA BA CA etc.

Mahatma Gandhi has noted that the poem includes some Urdu words and Persian legends representing study of Persian works by Manilal.

Lyrics

Reception
Amar Asha is popular among Gujarati people.

Mahatma Gandhi liked the poem and reviewed it in his magazine Indian Opinion. He took it from Kavyamadhurya and included it in his collection of poems Nitina Kavya along with the review. He praised it for the themes of finding god and love. He noted that it is written by a Hindu scholar in an Islamic style so Hindus and Muslims "both should be proud of it". He also noted that "the beloved" (Sanam) can be interpreted as a lover as well as the God or knowledge, similar to the interpretation of poems of Omar Khayyam.

In 1900, Manilal's disciple Gaurishankar Govindji Mehta had the poem reviewed by Vedanta monk Atmanand who had tried to interpret it in terms of Vedanta philosophy. Gajendrashankar Pandya has called the poem "immortal".

Gujarati critic Mansukhlal Jhaveri called it "a gem of Gujarati poetry".

Notes

References

External links
 

Works by Manilal Dwivedi
1898 poems
Gujarati-language poems
Ghazals
Indian poems